Drzewice is the north-western borough (osiedle) of the town of Kostrzyn nad Odrą in western Poland.

During World War II, the Stalag III-C German prisoner-of-war camp for Polish, French, British, Serbian, Belgian, Italian, American and Soviet prisoners of war was located there.

Kostrzyn nad Odrą
Neighbourhoods in Poland